This is the complete list of men's medalists of the European Athletics Championships.

Track

100 metres

200 metres

400 metres

800 metres

1500 metres

5000 metres

10,000 metres

110 metres hurdles

400 metres hurdles

3000 metres steeplechase

4 x 100 metres relay

4 x 400 metres relay

Road

Half marathon

Marathon

20 kilometres race walk

35 kilometres race walk

Field

Long jump

Triple jump

High jump

Pole vault

Shot put

Discus throw

Hammer throw

Javelin throw

Decathlon

Discontinued events

10,000 metres track walk

50 kilometres race walk

See also
List of European Athletics Championships medalists (women)
List of World Athletics Championships medalists (men)
List of World Athletics Championships medalists (women)

References
European Championships (Men). GBR Athletics. Retrieved 2019-07-11.

European Championships men

Athletics European Championships
European Championships medalists